Alfheimbjerg (meaning "Alfheim Mountain" in Danish) is a mountain in the King Frederick VI Coast, Sermersooq, southeastern Greenland.

It is named after Álfheimr, the abode of the elves in Norse mythology.

Geography
This mountain is a nunatak that rises off the southwestern end of the Odinland peninsula, between the western side of the Fimbul Glacier terminus and the northern side of the terminus of the Bernstorff Glacier. 

To the northeast of Alfheimbjerg, on the opposite side of the Fimbul Glacier, rises the Brages Range by the confluence of the Sleipner Glacier.

See also
List of mountains in Greenland
List of nunataks

References

External links
Not so green - Odin Land
Nunataks of Greenland
Mountains of Greenland